Scoot is a low-cost airline in Singapore.

Scoot or skoot may also refer to:
SCOOT (bus service), a shuttle service in California
Scoot (EP), a 1997 EP album
Skoot (ship)
Scoot McNairy (born 1977), American actor and producer
Scoot Networks, an American company which provides public electric scooter sharing systems
Split Cycle Offset Optimisation Technique, a traffic control system
SKØØT, a streetwear label designed by MLMA

See also
Scooter (disambiguation)